Railer is the ninth studio album by American skate punk band Lagwagon, released on 4 October 2019 by Fat Wreck Chords on CD and LP. It's their first studio album in five years since Hang, which was released in 2014.

Background 
The album was announced on 29 July 2019, and a new song of the album called "Bubble" was released. A tour with Face to Face to support the upcoming album was simultaneously announced. A second song, called "Surviving California", was released on 4 September. A music video for this song was released in November 2019. The entire album was made available for streaming on 2 October, before being released two days later.

Track listing 
All songs are written by Joey Cape, unless noted otherwise.
 "Stealing Light" - 2:35
 "Surviving California" (Joe Raposo/Joey Cape) - 2:51
 "Jini" - 2:53
 "Parable" - 2:59
 "Dangerous Animal" - 2:21
 "Bubble" - 3:25
 "The Suffering" - 4:34
 "Dark Matter" - 2:37
 "Fan Fiction" - 3:25
 "Pray for Them" - 2:53
 "Auf Wiedersehen" - 2:38
 "Faithfully" (Jonathan Cain) (Journey cover) - 2:45

Performers 
 Joey Cape – vocals
 Chris Flippin – guitar
 Chris Rest – guitar
 Dave Raun – drums
 Joe Raposo – bass

Charts

References 

Lagwagon albums
2019 albums
Fat Wreck Chords albums